Nicholas Bubwith (1355-1424) was a Bishop of London, Bishop of Salisbury and Bishop of Bath and Wells as well as Lord Privy Seal and Lord High Treasurer of England.

Bubwith was collated Archdeacon of Dorset in 1397 and again in 1400. He was selected as Bishop of London on 14 May 1406 and consecrated 26 September 1406.

Bubwith was Lord Privy Seal from 2 March 1405 to 4 October 1406. He was Lord High Treasurer from 15 April 1407 to 14 July 1408. He also planned the building of St Saviour's Wells hospital but actual construction of the building started after his death.

Bubwith was translated to the see of Salisbury on 22 June 1407.

Bubwith was then translated to the see of Bath and Wells on 7 October 1407. He died 27 October 1424.

Citations

References

 

Bishops of Bath and Wells
Bishops of Salisbury
Bishops of London
Lords Privy Seal
Lord High Treasurers of England
Masters of the Rolls
Archdeacons of Richmond
15th-century English Roman Catholic bishops
1355 births
1424 deaths